Greek National Road 66 is a national highway in southern Greece. It connects Nemea with Levidi, via Skoteini. Near its eastern terminus it intersects with the A7 and then ends at its intersection with EO7.

66
Roads in Peloponnese (region)